Michael is an unincorporated community in Calhoun County, Illinois, United States. Michael had a post office until September 7, 2011; it still has its own ZIP Code, 62065.

References

Unincorporated communities in Calhoun County, Illinois
Unincorporated communities in Illinois